Dingla is a historic region in Bhojpur District in the Koshi Zone of eastern Nepal. It includes three Village development committees: Keurepani, Mulpani, and Tunggochha.  One of the first schools of Nepal was established in this region in 1879 AD.
Recently, another municipality named "shadanada" has been announced by government of Nepal. Tungechha, Mulpani, Keurenipani, Kimalung and Khartamchha V.D.C are included in newly announced municipality. Dingla Bazaar is the centre of this second municipality of Bhojpur district.

References
Dingla (Nepali: दिङ्ला) is a historic region in Bhojpur District in the Kosi Zone of eastern Nepal. It includes three Village development committees: Keurepani, Mulpani, and Tunggochha. One of the first schools of Nepal was established in this region in 1879 AD. Recently, another municipality named "shadanada" has been announced by government of Nepal. Tungechha, Mulpani, Keurenipani, Kimalung and Khartamchha V.D.C are included in newly announced municipality. Dingla Bazaar is the centre of this second municipality of Bhojpur district.

External links
UN map of the municipalities of Bhojpur District

Populated places in Bhojpur District, Nepal